The Tour Féminin en Limousin is an elite women's road bicycle stage race held in France. The race was established in 2005 and is rated by the UCI as a 2.2 category race.

Past winners 

Source:

References

External links
 Official website
 

 
Recurring sporting events established in 2005
Cycle races in France
2005 establishments in France
Women's road bicycle races